Kileh Sefid (also Romanized as Kīleh Sefīd; also known as Kal-e Sefīd, Kel-e Sefīd, Qal’eh Safīd, Qal‘eh Sefīd, and Qal‘eh-ye Safīd) is a village in Jeygaran Rural District, Ozgoleh District, Salas-e Babajani County, Kermanshah Province, Iran. At the 2006 census, its population was 149, in 34 families.

References 

Populated places in Salas-e Babajani County